Mutantes e Seus Cometas no País do Baurets is the fifth album by the Brazilian rock band Os Mutantes, released in 1972. It is their last official release with vocalist Rita Lee; they would record and release Hoje É o Primeiro Dia do Resto da Sua Vida later in that same year, but it would be considered a Lee solo album due to the label being more confident on her success than theirs. The album's cover art is by comic artist Alain Voss.

Track listing

Personnel
Os Mutantes
 Arnaldo Baptista: vocals (tracks 1, 4, 5, 7, 9, 10), keyboards
 Rita Lee: vocals (tracks 2, 8, 9), synthesizers, backing vocal
 Sérgio Dias: vocals (tracks 3, 6, 9, 10), guitars, sitar
 Liminha: bass, backing vocal
 Dinho Leme: drums

References

1972 albums
Os Mutantes albums
Polydor Records albums